James Ruffin (born February 6, 1987) is a former American football defensive end. He played college football at University of Northern Iowa.

Professional career

Tampa Bay Buccaneers
Ruffin was signed by the Tampa Bay Buccaneers as an undrafted free agent in 2010. He was released by the Buccaneers on September 4, 2010.

Cincinnati Bengals
Ruffin signed with the Cincinnati Bengals on October 17, 2010. He was released by the Bengals on September 3, 2011.

Spokane Shock
Ruffin played with the Spokane Shock from 2012 to 2014. In 2014, Ruffin set the Spokane Shock record for sacks in a season, and is the Shock's career sack leader. Ruffin's play in 2014 earned him the AFL's Defensive Lineman of the Year Award. On November 24, 2014, Ruffin was again assigned to the Shock.

Tampa Bay Buccaneers
Ruffin was signed by the Tampa Bay Buccaneers on August 5, 2014. Ruffin was waived by the Buccaneers on August 21, 2014.

Spokane Shock (second stint)
On November 24, 2014, Ruffin was again assigned to the Shock.

Personal life
Married November 4, 2017 to Amber Cardinal

References

External links
Arena Football League bio

1987 births
Living people
American football defensive ends
Northern Iowa Panthers football players
Spokane Shock players
Tampa Bay Buccaneers players
Cincinnati Bengals players
Players of American football from Newark, New Jersey